XHSCAK-FM is a community radio station broadcasting to Taxco de Alarcón, Guerrero on 107.9 FM. It is known as Plata Radio and owned by Domi Bello de Tenorio, A.C.

History

Domi Bello de Tenorio filed for a station in Taxco on October 6, 2016. The concession was received on August 27, 2018, and the station began broadcasting in 2019.

References

Radio stations in Guerrero
Community radio stations in Mexico
Radio stations established in 2019